Arthrochilus aquilus, commonly known as the dark elbow orchid, is a flowering plant in the orchid family (Orchidaceae) and is endemic to the northern part of Cape York in Queensland. It has up to five dark green leaves at its base and up to fifteen pale green, insect-like flowers with dark reddish black glands on its labellum.

Description
Arthrochilus aquilus is a terrestrial, perennial, deciduous, sympodial herb with an underground tuber which produces daughter tubers on the end of root-like stolons.
The petals and lateral sepals turn backwards against the ovary. Flowering occurs from November to February.

Taxonomy and naming
Arthrochilus aquilus was first formally described in 2004 by David Jones from a specimen collected in the Heathlands Reserve near the tip of Cape York. The description was published in The Orchadian. The specific epithet (aquilus) is a Latin word meaning "dark coloured" or "blackish".

Distribution and habitat
The dark elbow orchid grows in forest on the northern part of the Cape York Peninsula.

Ecology
As with other Arthrochilus orchids, A. aquilus is pollinated by male thynnid wasps of the genus Arthrothynnus although the species involved is not known. It also reproduces asexually by producing new tubers.

References 

aquilus
Plants described in 2004
Orchids of Queensland